Herreshoff Castle, formerly known as Castle Brattahlid, is an unusual residence located at 2 Crocker Park, Marblehead, Massachusetts. As of 2006, the owners have offered the carriage house as a bed-and-breakfast. The great room has not been part of the rental, but guests are typically offered a tour of it – and the rest of the castle.

History

Description in 1927 
The main building features on the ground floor a cook room, eating room, and pantry. The main room is above it, on the second floor, with a massive fireplace and entrance from Crocker Park, named after Uriel Crocker (1796–1887), who donated a large portion of the land. The park was originally known as Bartoll's Head. Stairs of oaken planks bolted onto a chain lead to another room of an entirely different period of architecture, with a high domed ceiling – also with a large fireplace, slightly smaller than the one in the main room.

The so-called Tower Building is two stories. The lower floor is for social purposes, the upper for a painting studio. The ceiling of the upper is open to the apex of the copper roof, with oak beams exposed. Within the walls is a secret stairway. There is also a small dungeon.

A stone stairway on the exterior leads to the main room. The windows are Gothic, small, but provide ample light. The doors are of solid oak planks, bolted together with half-inch steel rods.

View 
From the flat roof, the panoramic view extends from Boston Light on the south, to the Magnolia shore on the north, overlooking Marblehead Neck and the entire harbor.

Provenance

Ballard 
The castle was completed June 1927 by Marblehead artist Waldo Ballard (1873–1958) and his wife, Joan Ballard ( Joanna McCoy; 1873–1958), who stated that they based their design on Erik the Red's castle at Brattahlíð in Greenland, although the structure is Gothic in nature and does not resemble buildings of the type that would have been constructed at Brattahlíð during the era of Erik the Red. It is said that Ballard painted an oriental rug design on the castle's great room floor, based on an actual carpet in the nearby Jeremiah Lee Mansion.

Herreshoff 
In 1945 the Ballards sold the castle to L. Francis Herreshoff (1890–1972), son of noted yacht designer Nathanael Greene Herreshoff (1848–1938) and acclaimed yacht designer in his own right. Herreshoff, in 1926, had gone into business for himself as a yacht designer in Marblehead.

Vaughn 
After Herreshoff's death, Muriel M. Vaughn ( Muriel Elizabeth Miller; 1915–1990) occupied the castle. Muriel had been Herreshoff's secretary. According to her biography by the Mystic Seaport Museum, L. Francis Herreshoff had designated Vaughn as executrix and sole beneficiary of his estate. Vaughn moved into the Castle and continued to operate his yacht design business. She collected his writings into two books, Sensible Cruising Designs (1973) and An L. Francis Herreshoff Reader (1978).

Vaughn was the widow of Robert Lincoln Vaughn (1908–1958), who from 1951 to 1953 had been an executive officer at the Central Torpedo Office in Newport, Rhode Island. He was a graduate of Phillips Exeter (1927), Harvard College (1931), and Harvard Business School (1933). He died in 1958 from complications following an appendectomy. The Central Torpedo Office was an outgrowth of the Naval Torpedo Station, founded in 1869 on Goat Island. Muriel Vaughn, in 1936, was one of 6 women in a class of 67 graduates of the Massachusetts College of Pharmacy.

After Muriel died, Elizabeth Vaughn (born 1946), her daughter, inherited the estate, sold the Herreshoff Castle, but carried on some unfinished curation of Herreshoff's work.

Rubino 
Michael Horton Rubino, EdD, JD, and his wife, Christina ( Pranker), acquired the Herreshoff Castle in 1990. Rubino was born in Marblehead.

See also 
 Herreshoff family

Bibliography

Notes

References

External links

Residential buildings completed in the 20th century
Castles in Massachusetts
Bed and breakfasts in the United States
Houses in Marblehead, Massachusetts